King's Lynn Docks are located to the north of the town of King's Lynn in the English county of Norfolk. They are on the River Great Ouse which provides access to the North Sea via the Lynn Channel and The Wash.

The docks are operated as the Port of King's Lynn by Associated British Ports. It handles around 400,000 tonnes of cargo per year, including forest products, agribulk and manufacturing and recycling materials.

History
In the 13th century King's Lynn was one of England's most important ports. It attracted traders from the Hanseatic League trading for wool, cloth and salt.

The port infrastructure developed in the 19th century following the formation of a docks and railway company in 1865. This built the Alexandra Dock which was completed in 1869 and linked by rail in 1870. By 1876 over 500 ships were using the new dock each year. The port has traditionally relied on exporting agricultural produce for the bulk of its traffic.

Transport links
The docks are on the A1078 road and linked via this and the A148 road through King's Lynn to the main A47 trunk road to the south of the town. This provides links to the A17 and A1 roads to the west. Other main roads connect the port to the M11 motorway and A14 trunk road at Cambridge, providing links to the UK motorway network.

The nearest railway station is King's Lynn railway station on the Fen Line which runs between King's Lynn, Ely and Cambridge and provides links to London King's Cross and London Liverpool Street stations. The port had a railway link to this line in the 19th century, the last elements of which were closed in the 1990s.

Seafarers' welfare
The port now has a dedicated centre, set up by the Apostleship of the Sea, for visiting seafarers. The facility offers them a place to relax, and spend some quiet time, with free internet connection for them to use. It was opened on 17 November 2014 by Bishop Alan Hopes, Bishop of East Anglia. The centre is largely-funded by the Merchant Navy Welfare Board and the site on which it was built was provided by Associated British Ports.

References

External links
 Port of King's Lynn official website

Transport in Norfolk
Ports and harbours of Norfolk
Port cities and towns of the North Sea
Coastal features of Norfolk
King's Lynn